Drillia gibberulus is a species of sea snail, a marine gastropod mollusk in the family Drilliidae.

Description
The length of the shell attains 6 mm, its diameter 2 mm.

The small shell has an ovate-fusiform shape. It contains 6-7 subconvex whorls crossed by oblique, obtuse longitudinal plicae (5-7 in penultimate whorl and fewer in the body whorl). The small aperture is ovate. The simple columella is slightly angled. The outer lip is sharp-edged. The oblique anal sulcus is deep, narrow and slightly spherical in shape.

Distribution
This marine species occurs in the demersal zone off New Caledonia.

References

 M.M. Schepman, Full text of "Siboga expeditie" 
  Tucker, J.K. 2004 Catalog of recent and fossil turrids (Mollusca: Gastropoda). Zootaxa 682:1–1295
 Compendium of Marine Species of New Caledonia, Doc. Sci. Tech., seconde édition; IRD Nouméa

External links
 Syntype at the MNHN, Paris

gibberulus
Gastropods described in 1896